Preslav Milenov Petrov (Bulgarian: Преслав Миленов Петров; born 14 February 1997) is a Bulgarian footballer who plays as a defender for CSKA 1948 II.

Career

Ludogorets Razgrad
Petrov made his professional debut for the first team on 20 May 2018 in a league match against Botev Plovdiv.

Career statistics

Club

References

External links
 

1997 births
Living people
Bulgarian footballers
Bulgaria youth international footballers
PFC Ludogorets Razgrad II players
PFC Ludogorets Razgrad players
FC Montana players
First Professional Football League (Bulgaria) players
Association football defenders
Sportspeople from Ruse, Bulgaria